The Voluntary Voting System Guidelines (VVSG) are guidelines adopted by the United States Election Assistance Commission (EAC) for the certification of voting systems. The National Institute of Standards and Technology's Technical Guidelines Development Committee (TGDC) drafts the VVSG and gives them to the EAC in draft form for their adoption.

Guidelines (2021) 
"The Guidelines allow for an improved and consistent voter experience, enabling all voters to vote privately and independently, ensuring votes are marked, verified and cast as intended, and that the final count represents the true will of the voters."

The voting system 
"Equipment (including hardware, firmware, and software), materials, and documentation used to enact the following functions of an election:

 define elections and ballot styles,
 configure voting equipment,
 identify and validate voting equipment configurations,
 perform logic and accuracy tests,
 activate ballots for voters,
 record votes cast by voters,
 count votes,
 label ballots needing special treatment,
 generate reports,
 export election data including election results,
 archive election data, and
 produce records in support of audits."

All voting systems must also:
 Permit the voter to verify (in a private and independent manner) their choices before their ballot is cast and counted.
 Provide the voter with the opportunity (in a private and independent manner) to change their choices or correct any error before their ballot is cast and counted.
 Notify the voter if they have selected more than one candidate for a single office, inform the voter of the effect of casting multiple votes for a single office, and provide the voter an opportunity to correct their ballot before it is cast and counted.
 Be accessible for individuals with disabilities in a manner that provides the same opportunity for access and participation (including privacy and independence) as for all voters.
 Provide alternative language accessibility pursuant to Section 203 of the Voting Rights Act [VRA65].

Principles

High Quality Design 

 Functional equipment requirements are organized as phases of running an election: 
 Election and Ballot Definition
 Pre-election Setup and logic and accuracy (L&A) testing
 Opening Polls, Casting Ballots
 Closing Polls, Results Reporting 
 Tabulation, Audit
 Storage
 Requirements dovetail with cybersecurity in areas including:
 Pre-election setup
 Audits of barcodes versus readable content for ballot marking devices (BMDs)
 Audits of scanned ballot images versus paper ballots
 Audits of Cast Vote Record (CVR) creation
 Content of various reports
 Ability to match a ballot with its corresponding CVR
 Guidance relevant to testing and certification has been moved to the EAC testing and  certification manuals.

High Quality Implementation 

 Adds requirement to document and report on user-centered design process by developer to ensure system is designed for a wide range of representative voters, including those with and without disabilities, and election workers

Transparent 

 Addresses transparency from the point of view of documentation that is necessary and sufficient to understand and perform all operations

Interoperable 

 Ensures that devices are capable of importing and exporting data in common data formats
 Requires manufacturers to provide complete specification of how the format is implemented
 Requires that encoded data uses publicly available, no-cost method
 Uses common methods (for example, a USB) for all hardware interfaces
 Permits commercial-off-the-shelf (COTS) devices as long as relevant requirements are  still satisfied

Equivalent and Consistent Voter Access 

 Applies to all modes of interaction and presentation throughout the voting session, fully supporting accessibility

Voter Privacy 

 Distinguishes voter privacy from ballot secrecy and ensures privacy for marking, verifying, and casting the ballot

Marked, Verified, and Cast as Intended 

 Updates voter interface requirements such as font, text size, audio, interaction control and navigation, scrolling, and ballot selections review
 Describes requirements that are voting system specific, but derived from federal accessibility law

Robust, Safe, Usable, and Accessible 

 References, Section 508 Information and Communication Technology (ICT) Final Standards and Guidelines [USAB18] and Web Content Accessibility Guidelines 2.0 (WCAG 2.0) [W3C10]
 Updates requirements for reporting developer usability testing with voters and election workers

Auditable 

 Focuses on machine support for post-election audits
 Makes software independence mandatory
 Supports paper-based and end-to-end (E2E) verifiable systems
 Supports all types of audits, including risk-limiting audits (RLAs), compliance audits, and  ballot-level audits

Ballot Secrecy 

 Includes a dedicated ballot secrecy section
 Prevents association of a voter identity to ballot selections

Access Control 

 Prevents the ability to disable logging
 Bases access control on voting stage (pre-voting, activated, suspended, post-voting)
 Does not require role-based access control (RBAC)
 Requires multi-factor authentication for critical operations:
 Software updates to the certified voting system
 Aggregating and tabulating
 Enabling network functions
 Changing device states, including opening and closing the polls 
 Deleting the audit trail
 Modifying authentication mechanisms

Physical Security 

 Requires using only those exposed physical ports that are essential to voting operations
 Ensures that physical ports are able to be logically disabled
 Requires that all new connections and disconnections be logged

Data Protection 

 Clarifies that there are no hardware security requirements (for example, TPM (trusted platform module))
 Requires Federal Information Processing Standard (FIPS) 140-2 [NIST01] validated cryptographic modules (except for end-to-end cryptographic functions)

 Requires cryptographic protection of various election artifacts
 Requires digitally signed cast vote records and ballot images
 Ensures transmitted data is encrypted with end-to-end authentication

System Integrity 

 Requires risk assessment and supply chain risk management strategy
 Removes non-essential services
 Secures configurations and system hardening
 Exploit mitigation (for example, address space layout randomization (ASLR) data  execution prevention (DEP) and free of known vulnerabilities
 Requires cryptographic boot validation
 Requires authenticated updates
 Ensure sandboxing and runtime integrity

Detection and Monitoring 

 Ensures moderately updated list of log types
 Detection systems must be updateable
 Requires digital signatures or allowlisting for voting systems
 Requires malware detection focusing on backend PCs

History

Timeline 
 1990: Federal Election Commission adopts the federal government’s first set of voting system standards.
 The National Association of State Election Directors (NASED) begins testing voting equipment against the 1990 standards; NASED, a non-governmental entity, voluntarily offers the service to the states
 2002: FEC updates 1990 Voting System Standards. Federal government does not yet test voting equipment against these standards.
 NASED begins testing voting systems against the 2002 standards
 2002: Help America Vote Act (HAVA) creates the Election Assistance Commission
 HAVA transfers the responsibility of developing voting system standards from the FEC to the EAC
 HAVA requires EAC to set up the federal government’s first program to test voting equipment against the federal standards.
 HAVA also tasked the EAC with establishing the federal government’s first voting system certification program.
 HAVA renames the voting system standards, listing them as the voluntary voting system guidelines (VVSG)
 2005: the Election Assistance Commission unanimously adopted the 2005 Voluntary Voting System Guidelines (VVSG), which significantly increase security requirements for voting systems and expand access, including opportunities to vote privately and independently, for individuals with disabilities.
 2006: NASED terminates its voting system testing program
 2007: EAC launches full testing and certification program
 2015: The VVSG 1.1, an incremental revision to the 2005 VVSG 1.0, were unanimously approved by the Election Assistance Commission on March 31, 2015
 2021: VVSG 2.0 adopted on February 10, 2021

See also 
Election Security

References 

Election technology